Elections to Maldon District Council were held on 3 May 2007 as part of the wider elections across the United Kingdom. The Conservative Party remained in control of the council, winning 25 of the 30 seats.

Results

2007
2007 English local elections